Ella Blaylock Atherton (January 4, 1860 – September 4, 1933) was a British-born American physician. Atherton was the first woman in the province of Quebec to receive a diploma in medicine from a Canadian institution. She was the first woman admitted to a medical society in the U.S. state of Vermont; first to hold office of president of a local medical society in New Hampshire; and the first woman to do abdominal surgery in New Hampshire.

Early years and education
Ella Blaylock was born January 4, 1860, at Ulverston, Lancashire, England. She was the daughter of William and Margaret (Schollick) Blaylock, and granddaughter of Thomas Blaylock.

Atherton was educated under private tutors and at Georgeville Academy, and at McGill Normal School, Montreal, graduating with honors from the latter institution in 1881. Her life-long desire to study medicine met with great opposition from all her friends except her mother. She therefore determined to educate herself, and to do this she taught two years as principal of Mansonville Academy in Quebec, and tutored during her whole college course. She began to read medicine with Dr. J. McMillan, of Mansonville, while teaching there, and the following year, entered a medical school at Kingston, Ontario. Her first course of lectures was at the Royal College of Physicians and Surgeons, with men students. Much friction resulted and there was a repetition of the sad experience of the women students in Edinburgh, in 1872. The troubles resulted in the founding of the Woman's Medical College, affiliated with Queen's University, Kingston. At this college, she attended three courses of lectures, and received diplomas in medicine and surgery from Queen's University in 1887. Atherton, while in college, was for one year assistant demonstrator of anatomy, and later for one year had entire charge of the practical anatomy class. Atherton was the first woman in the province of Quebec, and the eighth in Canada, to receive a diploma in medicine from a Canadian institution.

Career
In 1887, Atherton was refused a license to practise in Quebec, though a man holding a Queen's diploma would have been granted a license without question. Her experience is of interest from the fact that three years later, 1890, the census gave 3,555 women physicians in the United States. She was also physician in charge, for six months, to the Kingston City Dispensary.

She practised medicine at Newport, Vermont, during the year following graduation, and thereafter at Nashua, New Hampshire. Her papers from
1898 onwards are held at Dartmouth.

Atherton served as physician to the Home for Aged Women, Nashua, since 1889, and on the staff of the Nashua Emergency Hospital since 1894. Atherton gave her chief attention to diseases of women and children, and performed all the minor and some of the capital gynecological operations.

She was the first woman admitted to a medical society in the state of Vermont; first to hold office of president of a local medical society in New Hampshire; and the first woman to do abdominal surgery in New Hampshire.

During the summer of 1926 she toured the hospitals of Europe with a group of other American physicians.

Affiliations
She was a member of the Orleans County (Vermont) Medical Society; the New Hampshire Medical Society; the Nashua Medical Association, secretary from 1892; the American Medical Association; the Congress of Medico-Climatology; and the Nashua Fortnightly Club. She was also a member of the New Hampshire Surgical Club; the Hillsborough County Medical Society; the Nashua Emergency Hospital Association; and the Nashua Home for Aged Women.

Personal life
In 1898, in Concord, New Hampshire, she married the widower, Capt. Henry B. Atherton, a lawyer, newspaper editor and Civil War veteran; she was his second wife. They had two children: Blaylock Atherton (b. 1900) and Ives (b. 1903).

Atherton traveled extensively with her husband to Newfoundland, Labrador and other parts of Canada.
 
Atherton was a member of the Woman's Auxiliary and the Young Women's Christian Association. She favored woman suffrage and was a member of the New Hampshire Woman Suffrage Society. She was also a charter member of the Woman's Auxiliary of the YMCA and the Fortnightly Club. In religion, she was Episcopalian, and attended the Church of the Good Shepherd in Nashua.

She was widowed when Capt. Atherton died in 1906. Atherton died in New Hampshire, September 4, 1933, and was buried at Edgewood Cemetery in Nashua Her son Blaylock Atherton presided over the New Hampshire state senate from 1951-1952, and was acting governor briefly in 1952.

References

Attribution
 
 
 

1860 births
1933 deaths
People from Ulverston
19th-century English medical doctors
19th-century American women physicians
19th-century American physicians
McGill University Faculty of Education alumni
Queen's University at Kingston alumni
Physicians from New Hampshire
Physicians from Vermont